Nicholas John Gillespie (born August 7, 1963) is an American libertarian journalist who was editor-in-chief of Reason magazine from 2000 to 2008 and editor-in-chief of Reason.com and Reason TV from 2008 to 2017. Gillespie originally joined Reason's staff in 1993 as an assistant editor and ascended to the top slot in 2000.  He is currently an editor-at-large at Reason. Gillespie has edited one anthology, Choice: The Best of Reason.

Life and career

Gillespie was born in Brooklyn, New York, and grew up in Monmouth County, New Jersey, where he graduated from Mater Dei High School. His educational history includes a B.A. in English and psychology from Rutgers University and a M.A. in English from Temple University, as well as a Ph.D. in English literature from the State University of New York at Buffalo. He has two sons, Jack and Neal Gillespie.

Before joining Reason, Gillespie worked at a number of small trade magazines and other journalistic outlets.

In an interview with CNN anchor Jake Tapper, Gillespie and Tapper said they contributed articles for the alternative website Suck.com in the 1990s. On Suck.com, Gillespie wrote under the pseudonym Mr. Mxyzptlk.

In 2010, The Daily Beast named Gillespie number 18 on their list of "The Right's Top 25 Journalists". Gillespie himself is a contributor to The Daily Beast.

Gillespie shared the award for "Best Advocacy Journalism" at the 53rd Annual Southern California Journalism Awards with Drew Carey and Paul Feine for their work "Reason Saves Cleveland."  He also received an honorable mention for "Best News Organization Website."

In 2011, Gillespie published The Declaration of Independents: How Libertarian Politics Can Fix What's Wrong with America with Reason editor-in-chief Matt Welch.

Gillespie is on the board of Ideas Beyond Borders, a nonprofit founded by Faisal Saeed Al Mutar and Melissa Chen.

Gillespie is known for wearing black, which he describes as appealing to his political beliefs. He calls himself an "apatheist," referring to his apathy over the question of God's existence. Although he was raised Catholic, he no longer identifies as one.

References

External links

"Reason Staff: Nick Gillespie"

1963 births
Living people
20th-century American journalists
American male journalists
20th-century American male writers
21st-century American journalists
21st-century American male writers
American libertarians
American magazine editors
American online journalists
American political journalists
American political writers
Journalists from New York City
Mater Dei High School (New Jersey) alumni
American opinion journalists
People from Monmouth County, New Jersey
Rutgers University alumni
Temple University alumni
University at Buffalo alumni
Writers from Brooklyn
American male non-fiction writers
20th-century pseudonymous writers
21st-century pseudonymous writers
Former Roman Catholics
American people of Irish descent
American people of Italian descent